Ogema is a city in Becker County, Minnesota, United States. The population was 208 at the 2020 census.

Geography

Demographics

2010 census
As of the census of 2010, there were 184 people, 73 households, and 49 families living in the city. The racial makeup of the city was 38.6% White, 46.2% Native American, and 15.2% from two or more races. Hispanic or Latino of any race were 3.3% of the population.

There were 73 households, of which 41.1% had children under the age of 18 living with them, 31.5% were married couples living together, 27.4% had a female householder with no husband present, 8.2% had a male householder with no wife present, and 32.9% were non-families. 28.8% of all households were made up of individuals, and 9.6% had someone living alone who was 65 years of age or older. The average household size was 2.52 and the average family size was 3.04.

The median age in the city was 27.5 years. 37.5% of residents were under the age of 18; 8.2% were between the ages of 18 and 24; 20.6% were from 25 to 44; 22.3% were from 45 to 64; and 11.4% were 65 years of age or older. The gender makeup of the city was 49.5% male and 50.5% female.

2000 census
As of the census of 2000, there were 143 people, 62 households, and 32 families living in the city. The racial makeup of the city was 60.14% White, 37.06% Native American, 1.40% from other races, and 1.40% from two or more races. Hispanic or Latino of any race were 1.40% of the population.

There were 62 households, out of which 19.4% had children under the age of 18 living with them, 37.1% were married couples living together, 11.3% had a female householder with no husband present, and 46.8% were non-families. 40.3% of all households were made up of individuals, and 25.8% had someone living alone who was 65 years of age or older. The average household size was 2.31 and the average family size was 3.12.

In the city the population was spread out, with 24.5% under the age of 18, 12.6% from 18 to 24, 19.6% from 25 to 44, 22.4% from 45 to 64, and 21.0% who were 65 years of age or older. The median age was 40 years. For every 100 females there were 85.7 males. For every 100 females age 18 and over, there were 80.0 males.

The median income for a household in the city was $27,083, and the median income for a family was $35,208. Males had a median income of $22,813 versus $19,583 for females. The per capita income for the city was $14,622. There were 8.9% of families and 7.8% of the population living below the poverty line, including 10.0% of under eighteens and none of those over 64.

References

Cities in Becker County, Minnesota
Cities in Minnesota